The 1911–12 Kangaroo tour of Great Britain was the second ever Kangaroo tour and was actually a tour by an "Australasian" squad that included four New Zealand players in addition to 24 Australian representatives. It took place over the British winter of 1911–12 and this time, to help promote the game of Rugby league in New Zealand, the Northern Rugby Football Union invited a combined Australian and New Zealand team. They became the first tourists to win the Ashes. and the last to do so on British soil for over half a century. The tour was a success in performance and organisation. Matches were well attended, the squad's touring payments were maintained throughout and the players all shared in a bonus at the tour's end.

Touring squad

Prior to the tour a three-way series of matches between New South Wales, Queensland and New Zealand was organised as a basis of selection for the tour. The New South Welshmen dominated the touring side, with four New Zealanders and only one Queenslander selected. However counted amongst the New South Welshmen was Con Sullivan, who had moved to Australia from New Zealand a few years before. Due to family and business commitments, rugby league great Dally Messenger declined to tour with the 1911–12 Kangaroos. His friend and teammate Sandy Pearce also chose not to go. Chris McKivat who had captained the 1908 Wallabies to Olympic Gold was at age 32 a natural selection as tour captain. The Heads/Middleton reference describes McKivat as being revered on that tour – a magnificent general, tough, durable and an inspiration to the men around him. It quotes Johnny Quinlan the tour co-manager "He always set a splendid example in conduct and training – a natural leader" Tour vice-captain was Paddy McCue. Tour managers were Charles H Ford and John Quinlan. The team sailed to England on the RMS Orvieto. The tourists were paid £4/5/ per week and received a bonus of £178 each.

New South Wales
All eight teams of the New South Wales Rugby Football League premiership were represented in the touring squad.

 Bob Stuart, forward for Annandale
 Bob Craig, forward for Balmain
 Charles "Chook" Fraser, fullback for Balmain
 Arthur "Pony" Halloway, half for Balmain
 Charles McMurtrie, forward for Balmain
 Dan Frawley, three-quarter for Eastern Suburbs
 Bob Williams, forward for Eastern Suburbs
 Peter Burge, forward for Glebe
 (c) Chris McKivat, half for Glebe
 Billy Farnsworth, half for Newtown
 Viv Farnsworth, three-quarter for Newtown
 Paddy McCue, forward for Newtown

 Joe Murray, forward for Newtown
 Webby Neill, fullback for Newtown
 Bill Noble, forward for Newtown
 Charlie Russell, three-quarter for Newtown
 Tom Berecry, North Sydney
 Albert Broomham, North Sydney
 Con Sullivan, forward for North Sydney
 W. A. Cann, forward for South Sydney
 Steve Darmody, South Sydney
 Herb Gilbert, three-quarter for South Sydney
 Howard Hallett, fullback for South Sydney
 Tedda Courtney, forward for Western Suburbs

New Zealand
The New Zealand players that accompanied the Australians on tour have been listed in the Australian Rugby League's Kangaroos players register.

 George A. Gillett (forward)
 Arthur Francis (forward)

 Charlie Savory (forward)
 Frank Woodward (half)

Queensland
Robert "Harold" Nicholson of Queensland was also selected for the tour but withdrew.

Tour schedule
Played: 35
Won: 28 Drew: 2 Lost: 5
Ashes: Australia 2–0

Test matches

First Ashes Test
Test No. 12

In this match, Australia's Charles Fraser became Australia's youngest Test player at 18 years and 301 days, a record which would stand until 2007.

Second Ashes Test
Test No. 13

McKivat lead the way for Australia dominating the rucks and scoring a vital try. Renowned Australian journalist Claude Corbett was acting as one of the touch judges and referee Renton, over-ruled his goal decision on one of the Australian conversion attempts.

Third Ashes Test
Test No. 14

Great Britain only needed to win the third Test to tie the series and keep the Ashes but were reduced to 12 men early in the encounter after an injury to Dick Ramsdale. Great Britain led 8–0 early but had no answer to the Australian attack as they ran in nine tries.

This would be the first (and final) time the Kangaroos would win The Ashes on British soil until the 1963–64 Kangaroo tour.

References

External links
 
 Ashes series 1911 at rugbyleagueproject.org

Australia national rugby league team tours
Rugby league tours of Great Britain
Kangaroo tour of Great Britain
Kangaroo tour of Great Britain
Kangaroo tour of Great Britain
Kangaroo tour of Great Britain
Kangaroo tour of Great Britain
Kangaroo tour of Great Britain
Kangaroo tour of Great Britain
Kangaroo tour of Great Britain
Kangaroo tour of Great Britain
Kangaroo tour of Great Britain